Department of Environmental Protection (DEP) may refer to:

United States 

Connecticut Department of Environmental Protection
Florida Department of Environmental Protection
Massachusetts Department of Environmental Protection
New Jersey Department of Environmental Protection
New York City Department of Environmental Protection
Pennsylvania Department of Environmental Protection

See also 
 Department of Conservation (disambiguation)
 Department of Environment and Conservation (disambiguation)
 Department of Environmental Management (disambiguation)
 Department of Natural Resources (disambiguation)
 List of environmental agencies in the United States
 List of environmental ministries